Tuğrul  is a village in Mut district of Mersin Province, Turkey. At  it is situated to the east of Göksu River valley. The population of the village was 164 as of 2012.

References

Villages in Mut District